Roberts Township is located in Marshall County, Illinois. As of the 2010 census, its population was 925 and it contained 544 housing units.

Geography

Demographics

References

External links

City-data.com
Illinois State Archives

Townships in Marshall County, Illinois
Peoria metropolitan area, Illinois
Townships in Illinois
1849 establishments in Illinois